Preston Alexander Whitmore II (born June 26, 1962) is an American film director, film producer, and screenwriter. He is best known for his 2007 comedy-drama This Christmas, garnered an NAACP Image Award nomination for Outstanding Directing in 2008.

Early life 
Whitmore was born in 1962 in Detroit, the third and youngest child of Shirley and Preston Alexander Whitmore, Sr. After dropping out of high school, he enlisted in the Marine Corps where he acquired his GED and began taking college courses focusing on law enforcement and criminal procedure. After being discharged from the Marines, he settled in California and went to Los Angeles City College, where he received his associates degree. He subsequently transferred to California State University, Northridge where he received his Bachelor of Arts degree in political science. After graduating from CSUN, Whitmore attended the University of La Verne College of Law, where he won the American Jurisprudence Award.

Film 
Whitmore entered the entertainment industry first as a rapper and lyricist for Brian and Eddie Holland of Motown fame. He turned his attention to screenwriting when Motown lyricist and recording artist, Angelo Bond, told him his stories were too big for a three-minute song. Following Bond's advice, Whitmore made two short films, This End of The Couch, starring Lewis Dix, Charles Holman and comedian Reynaldo Rey and No Reply starring Giancarlo Esposito and Darryl Sivad. Whitmore sold a number of high-profile spec scripts and was named by Fade-In Magazine one of Hollywood's "Hottest Young Writers".

Whitmore made his film-making debut by writing and directing The Walking Dead (1995), chronicling the lives and mission of four African-American soldiers in Vietnam, which drew on his experiences in the Marine Corps. It starred Allen Payne, Eddie Griffin, Joe Morton, Vonte Sweet, and Bernie Mac. Thereafter he wrote and executive-produced Fled (1996), an action picture starring Laurence Fishburne and Stephen Baldwin as two prisoners on the lam to find a hidden cache of cash and incriminating computer evidence that would bring down the Cuban Mafia.

His work has often focused on the disproportionate incarceration of African Americans. This is addressed in three films he wrote and produced. The first Lockdown (2000), starring Richard T. Jones, Gabriel Casseus and De'Aundre Bonds as a group of friends unjustly imprisoned, tracks the gritty dissolution of their innocence and friendship behind bars. The film, released under Rainforest Columbia Tri-star collaboration, was one of Columbia Tri-Star's top selling independent releases. Second, Civil Brand (2002) focuses on slave-labor programs in women's prisons. This independent, low-budget production starring LisaRaye, N'Bushe Wright, Monica Calhoun, Mos Def, Clifton Powell and Da Brat, won the Blockbuster Award for Best film, Best Actor; Clifton Powell, 2002 American Black Film Festival; Audience Award for Best Film, Special Jury Prize, and 2002 Urbanworld Film Festival and featured at the 2003 Sundance Film Festival.

In 2004, after completing a rewrite of the Get Shorty sequel entitled Be Cool, Whitmore wrote, produced and directed the Screen Gems film, Doing Hard Time (2004), starring Boris Kodjoe, Michael K. Williams, Giancarlo Esposito and Sticky Fingaz. Moving away from the gritty subject matter of prison films, Whitmore wrote and directed the basketball drama, Crossover (2006), a film shot in his hometown of Detroit about street basketball, starring Anthony Mackie, Wesley Jonathan, and Wayne Brady.

Whitmore wrote, produced, and directed This Christmas (2007), starring Loretta Devine, Idris Elba, Lauren London, Regina King, and Chris Brown. This Christmastime drama centers around the Whitfield family's first holiday together in four years and was inspired by individuals in Whitmore's actual family, the three Whitfield sons representing Whitmore in different phases of his life. The film won The Asian Excellence Award for Outstanding Actress in a Movie; Sharon Leal, nominated for an NAACP Image Award for Outstanding Supporting Actress in a Motion Picture; Loretta Devine, an NAACP Image Award for Outstanding Directing in a Motion Picture; Preston A. Whitmore, II, and an MTV Movie Award for Breakthrough Performance; Chris Brown.

Whitmore recently completed a trio of book adaptations, the independent feature film True to the Game directed by him, starring Columbus Short, Nelsan Ellis, Jennifer Freeman, Nafessa Williams, Andra Fuller, Draya Michele and Vivica Fox, based on the popular Teri Woods novel of the same name. It was released theatrically the summer of 2017 and debuted on Netflix in 2018. Whitmore penned the screenplay for the second installment of the popular Teri Woods novel of the same name True to the Game 2, directed by Jamal Hill. It was released theatrically November 6, 2020. He wrote and directed, Dutch (2021) starring Lance Gross, Natasha Marc, Macy Gray, James Hyde, and Melissa Williams, which was also based on a novel by Woods. 

Whitmore subsequently wrote and directed, "California Love" (2021), about a Jewish woman and a gang leader who fall in love while fighting racial injustice against the backdrop of the Los Angeles 1992 Riotstarring Allen Payne, Christa B. Allen and Robert Ri’chard. Whitmore's "Real Talk" (2021), which he wrote, directed, and produced was acquired by Imani Media Group. The film follows the humorous, sarcastic and sometimes harsh, talk radio host, Dominique the Dame, as she brings to the forefront America's contemporary views on race, sex, drugs, religion and technology. The radio program takes on a greater meaning when Dame mobilizes her listeners in a race against time to save the life of a pregnant teenager. It stars Jasmine Carmichael, Michael Beach, London Brown, Macy Gray, Roger Guenveur Smith, Casper Van Dien, Robert Ri’chard and Loretta Devine.

Whitmore develops television and feature film projects at his Los Angeles-based production company, The Preston Picture Company.

Television and Theater 
Whitmore has also worked in television and theater, writing episodes for the half-hour situation comedy, Malcolm & Eddie, starring Malcolm Jamal Warner and Eddie Griffin. Whitmore wrote and directed two plays: Five A.M. starring Yvonna Kopacz-Wright portraying five characters and Preston Whitmore's PIMP starring Paul Farmer about an unapologetic hustler named Slim Jenkins. Both plays debuted at the Tiffany Theater on Sunset Boulevard in Los Angeles. In addition, Whitmore also wrote and produced the television motion picture crime thriller, Blood Crime (2002), starring James Caan and Jonathan Schaech.

Radio 
Whitemore produces a weekly syndicated radio program, "Encouraging You To Go Higher", with Pastor Ron Taylor, for his church, Arise Christian Center.

Filmography 
2021 The Fight That Never Ends (Writer, Director)
2021 Real Talk (Writer, Producer, Director)
2021 Dutch (Writer, Director)
2020 True to the Game 2 (Writer)
2017 True to the Game (Director)
2009 Dough Boys (Producer, Writer)
2007 This Christmas (Writer, Producer, Director)
2006 Crossover (Writer, Director)
2004 Doing Hard Time (Writer, Producer, Director)
2002 Blood Crime (TV) (Writer, Producer)
2002 Civil Brand (Writer, Producer)
2000 Lockdown (Writer)
1996 Fled (Writer, Executive Producer)
1995 The Walking Dead (Writer, Director)

References

External links
 

1962 births
Living people
20th-century African-American writers
20th-century American male writers
20th-century American screenwriters
21st-century African-American writers
21st-century American male writers
21st-century American screenwriters
African-American male writers
African-American screenwriters
American film producers
American male screenwriters
California State University, Northridge alumni
Film directors from Michigan
Film producers from Michigan
Los Angeles City College alumni
Military personnel from Michigan
Screenwriters from Michigan
United States Marines
University of La Verne alumni
Writers from Detroit